Ram Sundar Das (9 January 1921 – 6 March 2015) was an Indian politician and former Chief Minister of Bihar state. He was a two-time Member of Parliament from Hajipur constituency.

Early life and family
Das was born on 9 January 1921 into Chamar caste in Gangajal near Sonpur, Saran District in Bihar. He matriculated from a school in Sonpur and attended Vidyasagar College in Calcutta. He dropped out of college to join the Indian freedom movement. He was married to Savita Devi in 1956 and had three children, two sons and one daughter.

Political career
He played an active role in 1942 Quit India Movement. Das served as a functionary in Congress Socialist Party in his native place Sonpur. The Congress Socialist Party, through a series of mergers became a part of the Praja Socialist Party (PSP). Das served as member of PSP's Bihar Provincial Executive Council. In 1957 Lok Sabha elections, he was Socialists' losing candidate from Hajipur. Later he would win the seat twice. In 1968, he was elected as a Member of Bihar's legislative council and continued in this role until 1977.

In the 1977 Bihar Legislative Assembly election, that led to a decisive defeat of the ruling Indian National Congress at the hands of Janata party, Das was elected as the MLA for Sonpur. Janata Party was a recent amalgam of disparate groups including Indian National Congress (O), Bharatiya Lok Dal, Socialists and Jana Sangh.

In fight in the party broke over the question of Chief Minister, Karpoori Thakur's decision to implement the Mungeri Lal Commission report, that recommended the institution of reservations for Backward Castes in government jobs. Upper caste members of Janata Party tried to water down the reservation policy by unseating Thakur as Chief Minister. To wean away Dalit MLAs, Das, a Dalit himself, was nominated as the candidate. Though Das and Thakur were both Socialist, Das was considered more moderate and accommodative than the Chief Minister. Thakur resigned and Das became the Chief Minister of Bihar on 21 April 1979. The reservation law was weakened by allowing upper castes to obtain a greater percentage of government jobs. The internal tensions in Janata Party caused it to split into multiple factions which led to Congress returning to power in 1980.

In the late 1980s, some of the remnants of Janata Party had come together to form Janata Dal, which formed a coalition government at the national level following the 1989 Indian general election. In 1990 Bihar Legislative Assembly election, Janata Dal won the largest number of seats and sought to form government with the outside support of BJP and Communists. Das was a contender for Chief Ministership pitted against Raghunath Jha and Lalu Prasad Yadav. Yadav was supported by Devi Lal and Nitish Kumar, Jha by Chandra Shekhar and Das by Prime Minister, VP Singh.

Lalu Yadav had campaigned vastly in favour for implementing Mandal Commission, which sought to reserve government jobs for backward castes in Central government jobs. Das was less keen on this. VP Singh's support of Das was interpreted as a lack of enthusiasm for this form of social engineering. Nitish Kumar rallied backward caste MLAs towards Yadav. In the election, Yadav won narrowly over Das by a vote of 59 to 56. Jha won 12, mostly upper caste MLAs.

Ironically he joined Chandra Shekhar's Samajwadi Janata Party around 1995 though Chandra Shekhar had opposed his candidature for CM's post. Ram Sundar Das remained with that party until 2008, and in another twist joined Janata Dal (United) that time, though those people had also opposed his candidature for CM's post back in 1990. He died on 6 March 2015 at the age of 94.

Electoral record
 1957 : lost from Hajipur (Lok Sabha constituency) in 1957 Indian general election, as Socialist Party (India) candidate
 1968-1977 : Member of Bihar Legislative Council. 
 1977 : Lost Lok Sabha election from Hajipur as an independent, coming fourth and getting just 3,449 votes 
 1977 : Elected to Bihar Legislative Assembly from Sonpur (Vidhan Sabha constituency) (सोनपुर)
 Served as Chief Minister of Bihar in 1979
 1980 : Came third as Janata Party candidate in Sonpur, losing to Lalu Yadav of Janata Party (Secular)
 1984 : Lost Lok Sabha election from Palamu seat as Janata Party candidate, then in Bihar and now in Jharkhand. 
 1985 : Lost Bihar Vidhan Sabha election from Garkha (SC) seat, as Janata Party's candidate
 1990 : Elected to Bihar Vidhan Sabha from Patepur. Vacated the seat next year when elected to Lok Sabha.
 1991 : Elected to Lok Sabha from Hajipur, as Janata Dal candidate  
 1996 : Lost Lok Sabha election from Hajipur as Samata Party (led by Uday Mandal its President) candidate, but he could be a different person with the same name. Das was probably never a part of Samata Party.  
 1998 : Lost from Hajipur as member of Samajwadi Janata Party (Rashtriya)
 1999 : Lost from Hajipur as member of Samajwadi Janata Party (Rashtriya). Came third with just 5,027 votes.  
 2004 : One Ram Sundar Das lost Lok Sabha election from Hajipur as member of Samajwadi Janata Party (Rashtriya), but he might be another person with the same name because his age was just 67 as per the data. But the age could be a typo.
 2009 : Elected to Lok Sabha from Hajipur, as Janata Dal (United) candidate. Defeated Ram Vilas Paswan. 
 2014 : Lost Lok Sabha Election from Hajipur (came third), as candidate for Nitish Kumar's Janata Dal (United)

References

External links
Official biographical sketch in Parliament of India website
Chhote Saheb was a leader of the masses-former Bihar CM Ram Sundar Das

|-

|-
|-

Chief Ministers of Bihar
1921 births
2015 deaths
India MPs 1991–1996
India MPs 2009–2014
Vidyasagar College alumni
University of Calcutta alumni
Lok Sabha members from Bihar
People from Saran district
Chief ministers from Janata Party
Janata Party politicians
Janata Dal (United) politicians
Janata Dal politicians
Bihar MLAs 1977–1980
Candidates in the 2014 Indian general election
Samata Party politicians
Samajwadi Janata Party politicians